"Je t'aime je t'aime" (stylized as "'je t'aime ★ je t'aime") is Tomoko Kawase's fourth single released as Tommy February6, and the first single for her second studio album, "Tommy Airline". The single was released February 6, 2003 and peaked at #5 in Japan and stayed on the charts for 14 weeks. Translated from French, the title means: "I Love You, I Love You".

Track listing

References

External links 
 Tommy february6 Official Site Warner Music Japan (Current Official Site)
 Tommy february6 Official Site Sony Music Japan (Previous Official Site)

2003 singles
Tomoko Kawase songs
Songs written by Tomoko Kawase
Songs written by Shunsaku Okuda
2003 songs
Defstar Records singles